Dahlonega is an unincorporated community in Wapello County, Iowa, United States.

Geography
Dahlonega lies northeast of Ottumwa, near the junction of U.S. Route 63 and County Highway H-25.

History

Dahlonega was founded in Dahlonega Township. The site was originally named Shellbark because several homes were made of shellbark hickory wood, but was changed to Dahlonega, a Native American word meaning "gold" or "yellow".

The post office at Dahlonega operated from 1844 to 1907. A number of schools operated in the area. Dahlonega School No. 1 educated students from 1921 to 1959, and is now listed on the National Register of Historic Places.

Dahlonega's bid to become the county seat of Wapello County was defeated by one vote in 1843. 

In 1850, Dahlonega had three stores, a tavern, a blacksmith shop, a church, a school, and a sawmill. A town hall, a pottery, and two meat-packing houses followed in 1856.

Dahlonega's population was estimated at 300 in 1887, and was 292 in 1902. However, by 1917, the population had dropped to 131.

References

Unincorporated communities in Iowa
Unincorporated communities in Wapello County, Iowa